Enamorándome de Ramón is a Mexican telenovela produced by Lucero Suárez for Televisa. It is based on the Venezuelan telenovela written by Doris Seguí, Tomasa Tequiero produced in 2009. Filming began on December 1, 2016, at Televisa San Ángel.

The series stars José Ron as Ramón López and Esmeralda Pimentel as Fabiola Medina.

Plot 
Fabiola and Andrea are orphaned when their parents die in a plane crash, and both they and Hortensia, their grandmother, are surprised when they learn that the beneficiary of their inheritance of a million dollars is none other than Juana, the humble woman who works as their Nana.

The entire Medina family is outraged by the news and pressure Juana to give them the insurance money. She gets tired of everyone's selfishness and makes it clear that she will not allow anyone to administer the money, because she will do so thinking about the well-being of Andrea and Fabiola. Hortensia demands for Juana to leave, without imagining that her granddaughters will defend Juana, but after a misunderstanding she leaves.

Juana is not interested in money; her main concern is her son Ramón, a young nobleman who lived in the province working as a mechanic, but had to move to the capital after falling in love with Sofia, the daughter of a capo de la Mafia, who is forced to break his heart and demand that he leaves to protect him from her father.

Ramón arrives at the house of Luisa and Dalia, giving a great surprise to Juana, who makes him aware of the death of her bosses and the insurance. Ramón advises his mother to give the Medina family the insurance money to avoid problems with them.

Dalia takes Ramón to Antonio's car workshop to get him work and to his surprise, he meets Fabiola who does not lose her opportunity to make him feel bad, telling him that she is the owner and does not intend to hire him.

Despite their differences, there is a very special chemistry between them, and they can not hide the attraction and, at the same time, the rejection they have, which brings problems to Fabiola, and her relationship with Francisco, who gets upset with jealousy.

Fabiola had agreed to work in the machine shop just out of ambition. However, Ramón unmasks her to Juana, making her accept that she decided to work in the shop, just so they can trust her with the insurance money. Fabiola, knowing she was discovered, decides to continue working to show them that she can be responsible.

The daily coexistence is creating an increasingly strong attraction between Fabiola and Ramón, until the point of not being able to hide their feelings, but things get complicated when Sofia appears looking for Ramon. This time, she is not ready to give him up and she is determined to get Ramón back.

Meanwhile, Hortensia goes to several lawyers, to challenge the document that declares Juana as sole beneficiary of the Medina family's life insurance, as well as inventing that the insurance signature is false, blaming Juana as a counterfeiter. She does not mind losing the insurance just so she can see Juana in jail. It is revealed that Juana truly is the beneficiary of the insurance after Andrea and Jorge find a video tape where Fabiola and Andrea's parents decide to leave the money to Juana.

Thus, while Juana struggles with the constant attacks of Hortensia, Ramón is in the midst of two women who are in love with him and will fight with everything to stay with his love.

Cast

Main 
 José Ron as Ramón López
 Esmeralda Pimentel as Fabiola Medina

Recurring 

 Nuria Bages as Hortensia
 Marcelo Córdoba as Julio Medina
 Luz Elena González as Roxana 
 Arturo Carmona as Antonio Fernández 
 Lisset as Virginia de Medina
 Carlos Bracho as Pedro 
 Alejandro Ibarra as Porfirio
 Marisol del Olmo as Juana López
 Fabiola Guajardo as Sofia Vásquez
 Pierre Angelo as Benito
 Bárbara Torres as Luisa
 Claudia Martin as Andrea Medina 
 Pierre Louis as Jorge Medina
 María Alicia Delgado as Fredesvinda
 Rebeca Mankita as Emilia
 Sachi Tamashiro as Margarita Medina
 Gonzalo Peña as Francisco Santillán 
 Alfredo Gatica as Raúl "Rulo"
 Ana Jimena Villanueva as Dalia
 Diego Escalona as Diego Fernández
 Sugey Ábrego as Adalgisa
 Alejandro Valencia as Valente Esparza
 Ivan Amozurrutia as Osvaldo Medina
 Steph Bumelcrownd as Sara Soler 
 Marlene Kalb as Susana
 Jorge Ortín as Lucho
 Alejandro Peniche as Agustín
 Fernanda Vizzuet as Verónica
 Alejandro Muela as Alfonso "Poncho"
 Solkin Ruz as Salvador "Chava"
 Jose Luis Badalt as Darío
 Rodrigo Vidal as Finito

Special participation 
 Eduardo Shacklett as Ricardo Medina 
 Lupita Jones as Katy Fernández de Medina
 Benny Ibarra as Rosendo "El Bocanegra" Vásquez

Rating

Mexico rating

U.S. rating

Awards and nominations

References 

Mexican telenovelas
Televisa telenovelas
2017 telenovelas
2017 Mexican television series debuts
2017 Mexican television series endings
Mexican television series based on Venezuelan television series
Spanish-language telenovelas